Supreme Headquarters Allied Expeditionary Force (SHAEF) was the headquarters of the Commander of Allied forces in northwest Europe, from late 1943 until the end of World War II. US General Dwight D. Eisenhower was the commander in SHAEF throughout its existence. The position itself shares a common lineage with Supreme Allied Commander Europe and Atlantic, but they are different titles.

History
Eisenhower transferred from command of the Mediterranean Theater of Operations to command SHAEF, which was formed in Camp Griffiss, Bushy Park, Teddington, London, from December 1943; an adjacent street named Shaef Way, and a gate into the park called Shaef Gate, remain to this day. Southwick House was used as an alternative headquarters near Portsmouth. Its staff took the outline plan for Operation Overlord created by Lieutenant General Sir Frederick E. Morgan, Chief of Staff to the Supreme Allied Commander (Designate) (COSSAC), and Major General Ray Barker. Morgan, who had been appointed chief of staff to the Supreme Allied Commander (designate) in mid-March 1943 began planning for the invasion of Europe before Eisenhower's appointment and moulded the plan into the final version, which was executed on 6 June 1944. That process was shaped by Eisenhower and the land forces commander, General Sir Bernard Law Montgomery, for the initial part of the invasion.

SHAEF remained in the United Kingdom until sufficient forces were ashore to justify its transfer to France. At that point, Montgomery ceased to command all land forces but continued as Commander in Chief of the British 21st Army Group (21 AG) on the eastern wing of the Normandy bridgehead. The US 12th Army Group (12 AG) commanded by Lieutenant General Omar Bradley was created as the western wing of the bridgehead. As the breakout from Normandy took place, the Allies launched the invasion of southern France on 15 August 1944 with the US 6th Army Group (6 AG) under the command of Lieutenant General Jacob L. Devers. During the invasion of southern France, the 6 AG was under the command of the Allied Forces Headquarters (AFHQ) of the Mediterranean Theatre of Operations, but after one month command passed to SHAEF. By this time, the three Army Groups had taken up the positions on the Western Front in which they would remain until the end of the war—the British 21 AG to the North, the American 12 AG in the middle and the 6 AG to the South. By December 1944, SHAEF had established itself in the Trianon Palace Hotel in Versailles, France. In February 1945, it moved to Reims and on 26 May 1945, to Frankfurt.

Order of battle
SHAEF commanded the largest number of formations ever committed to one operation on the Western Front, with American, Free French, British and Canadian forces. It commanded all Allied airborne forces as an airborne army, as well as three army groups that controlled a total of eight field armies;

  First Allied Airborne Army
 all Allied airborne divisions, brigades and paratrooper transport wings
  British 21st Army Group
  First Canadian Army 
  Second British Army
  US 12th Army Group
  First United States Army
  Third United States Army
  Ninth United States Army
  Fifteenth United States Army
  US 6th Army Group
  French First Army
  Seventh United States Army

SHAEF also controlled substantial naval forces during Operation Neptune, the assault phase of Overlord, and two tactical air forces: the US Ninth Air Force and the RAF Second Tactical Air Force. Allied strategic bomber forces in the UK also came under its command during Operation Neptune.

Commanders and senior staff

Additionally 
Secretary, General Staff: Colonel Ford Trimble 
G-1: Major-general Ray Barker
G-2 (Intelligence): John Whiteley, then Major-General Kenneth Strong
G-3: Major-general Harold Bull
G-4: Major-general Robert Crawford
G-5: Major-general Sir Roger Lumley then Lt-general Arthur Edward Grasett
Services of Supply/Communications Zone: Lt-general John C. H. Lee

Political officers

Ambassador William Phillips (US)
Mr. Charles Peake (UK)
Mr. Christopher Steel (UK)
Mr. Samuel Reber (US)
Ambassador Robert Daniel Murphy (US)

Missions

Post-World War II successors
After the surrender of Germany, SHAEF was dissolved on 14 July 1945.

American
With respect to the U.S. forces, it was replaced by U.S. Forces, European Theater (USFET). USFET was reorganized as EUCOM (European Command, not to be confused with the present-day United States European Command) on 15 March 1947.

1948–1951: Western Union
The 1948–1951 Western Union Defence Organization's (WUDO) command structure was largely patterned on SHAEF's structure.

1951–present: Supreme Headquarters Allied Powers Europe/Allied Command Operations
Starting in April 1951 when the North Atlantic Treaty Organization (NATO) cannibalised WUDO, it was put under the command of Supreme Allied Commander Europe Dwight D. Eisenhower in Supreme Headquarters Allied Powers Europe (SHAPE; Allied Command Europe [ACE]), comprising many of the same allies that were part of SHAEF. WUDO, followed by SHAPE, were in many respects the successors to SHAEF.

SHAPE is currently the headquarters of NATO's Allied Command Operations (ACO). Since 1967 it has been located at Casteau, north of the Belgian city of Mons, but it had previously been located, from 1953, at Rocquencourt, next to Versailles, France.

From 1951 to 2003, SHAPE was the headquarters of Allied Command Europe (ACE). Since 2003 it has been the headquarters of ACO, controlling all NATO operations worldwide.

2017–present: Military Planning and Conduct Capability
The European Union has established a Military Planning and Conduct Capability (MPCC), which is due to gain more tasks and may rival SHAPE's dominance as the primary forum for multinational European missions.

Notes and references

Notes

References
 Winters, Major Dick, with Cole C. Kingseed (2006). Beyond Band of Brothers: The War Memoirs of Major Dick Winters. Berkley Hardcover. ., p. 210.

External links

 Records of Supreme Headquarters, Allied Expeditionary Force, Dwight D. Eisenhower Presidential Library
 Papers of Ernest R. "Tex" Lee, military aide to General Eisenhower, 1942–1945, Dwight D. Eisenhower Presidential Library
 Papers of Thor Smith, Public Relations Division, SHAEF, Dwight D. Eisenhower Presidential Library
 Daily Battle Communiques, SHAEF, June 6, 1944 – May 7, 1945, L. Tom Perry Special Collections, Harold B. Lee Library, Brigham Young University
 BBC WW2 People's War article on Uxbridge SHAEF and London Bushey

Allied commands of World War II
Dwight D. Eisenhower